Alfred Stephen Henry (28 April 1890 – 27 September 1938) was an Australian politician.

He was born at Warialda to doctor Thomas James Henry and Ada Emily, née Stephen. He attended Grafton Public School and King's School, Parramatta, and then trained in the law with F. McGuren at Grafton. In 1917, the year he was admitted as a solicitor, he enlisted in the Australian Imperial Force as a private in the 15th Field Ambulance. In 1919 he established a legal practice in Sydney, and on 27 November 1920 he married Flora Isabel Stewart in Auckland, New Zealand, with whom he had a son. In 1931 Henry was elected to the New South Wales Legislative Assembly as the Country Party member for Clarence, serving until 1938. His brother, Thomas Gwydir Henry (1891-1984), was a member of the New Guard in Grafton. He died later that year near Stroud.

References

1890 births
1938 deaths
National Party of Australia members of the Parliament of New South Wales
Members of the New South Wales Legislative Assembly
20th-century Australian politicians